The Uailan River is a river of Roraima state in northern Brazil. It is a tributary of the Maú or Ireng River.

The sources of the river are in the  Monte Roraima National Park, created in 1989.

See also
List of rivers of Roraima

References

Brazilian Ministry of Transport

Rivers of Roraima